Jessore Junction Railway Station  is a station in Jessore, Khulna Division, Bangladesh. The station is the main station of Jessore and is linked to Khulna, Dhaka & India by the Darshana-Jessore-Khulna Line.

History
Its new station building was opened in 2005. The Bandhan Express now connects Khulna to Kolkata via Jashore.

References 

Jashore District
Railway stations in Jessore District
Railway junction stations in Bangladesh